The Montagne Sainte-Geneviève is a hill overlooking the left bank of the Seine in the 5th arrondissement of Paris. Atop the Montagne are the Panthéon and the Bibliothèque Sainte-Geneviève, used by the students of the University of Paris (La Sorbonne). The side streets of the Montagne feature bars and restaurants, for example, in the Rue Mouffetard.

Moreover, the former campus of the École Polytechnique, located on the Montagne, now is the Ministry of Research. On the other side of the Montagne lie the rue d'Ulm and the École Normale Supérieure. Around AD 1110, the scholar and philosopher, Peter Abelard, established a school on the Montagne; twenty-six years later, Abelard returned, in the year 1136.

See also 

 Abbey of St Genevieve
 Lycée Henri IV
 Lycée Saint-Louis
 Lycée Louis-le-Grand
 Les trois lycées de la montagne
 École supérieure de physique et de chimie industrielles de la ville de Paris (ESPCI ParisTech)
 Saint-Étienne-du-Mont
 Genevieve
 Quartier Latin
 Collège Sainte-Barbe
 Collège de Tournai
 Collège de Boncourt
 Collège de Navarre

References

Landforms of Paris
5th arrondissement of Paris
Restaurant districts and streets in France
Sainte-Genevieve